Eukaryotic translation initiation factor 5B is a protein that in humans is encoded by the EIF5B gene.

Accurate initiation of translation in eukaryotes is complex and requires many factors, some of which are composed of multiple subunits. The process is simpler in bacteria which have only three initiation factors (IF1, IF2, IF3). Two of these factors are conserved in eukaryotes: the homolog of IF1 is eIF1A and the homolog of IF2 is eIF5B. This gene encodes eIF5B. Factors eIF1A and eIF5B interact on the ribosome along with other initiation factors and GTP to position the initiation methionine tRNA on the start codon of the mRNA so that translation initiates accurately.

References

Further reading